Gemma Newman known as the Plant Power Doctor is a British medical doctor, nutritionist, author and advocate of whole food plant-based nutrition.

Biography

Newman studied at the University of Wales College of Medicine and has worked as a medical doctor since 2004. She is a general practitioner and Senior Partner at The Orchard Surgery in Ashford, Surrey. She is also a qualified Reiki practitioner for the purpose of pain relief. Newman is an ambassador of Plant-Based Health Professionals UK. She has been featured on Channel 4, Channel 5, ITV and Sky News Sunrise. Newman appeared in the film Vegan 2018. She was a speaker at VegfestUK and VegMed Web 2021. She has supported the campaign "No Meat May", a plea for the public to give up eating meat for a month.

Newman promotes a whole food plant-based (WFPB) diet to her patients. A WFPB diet forbids all animal source foods and emphasises the consumption of fruits, vegetables, legumes, wholegrains, nuts and seeds consumed in their natural state as opposed to heavily processed versions. Newman has argued that this way of eating provides dietary fiber for gut health and plenty of antioxidants and phytochemicals that can reduce the risk of bowel cancer, heart disease, type 2 diabetes and autoimmune conditions. Newman authored The Plant Power Doctor in 2021 which includes WFPB recipes. It was nominated for the VegfestUK 2021 Favourite Plant-Based Book of the Year.

Selected publications

The Plant Power Doctor: A Simple Prescription for a Healthier You London: Penguin, 2021; .

References

External links
Gemma Newman

21st-century British medical doctors
21st-century British non-fiction writers
Alumni of Cardiff University
British cookbook writers
British general practitioners
British health and wellness writers
British nutritionists
British veganism activists
Living people
People from Ashford, Surrey
Plant-based diet advocates
Reiki practitioners
Year of birth missing (living people)